Sokan may refer to:

Concepts
Sōkan, a Japanese system of rankings for Buddhist clergy
Sokan, a form of lightsaber combat in the Star Wars fictional universe
Royal tonsure ceremony, known in Thai as sokan

People
 Shinmen Sokan (16th century), daimyō, a head of the Japanese clan of Shinmen
 Yamazaki Sōkan (1465–1553), aka Sōkan, Japanese poet of renga and haikai
 Lana Ladd Stokan, American politician from Missouri

Places
 Sokan, Iran (disambiguation)